The Marawing 1-L Malamut is a Czech ultralight aircraft, designed and produced by Marawing of Kolín. The aircraft is supplied as a complete ready-to-fly-aircraft.

Design and development
The Malamut was developed from the classic Piper J-3 Cub. It was designed to comply with the Fédération Aéronautique Internationale microlight rules. It features a strut-braced high-wing, a two-seats-in-tandem enclosed cockpit, fixed conventional landing gear and a single engine in tractor configuration.

The aircraft is constructed in the same manner as the Cub. The fuselage is made from welded steel tubing, while the wings have a wooden structure, all covered in doped aircraft fabric. The standard engine available is the  Rotax 912UL four-stroke powerplant.

Specifications (1-L Malamut)

References

External links

2000s Czech ultralight aircraft
Single-engined tractor aircraft